James Crossley FSA (31 March 1800 – 1 August 1883) was an English lawyer, author, bibliophile and literary scholar who was President of the Chetham Society from 1847 to 1883 and President of the Record Society of Lancashire and Cheshire from 1878 to 1883.

Life
James Crossley was born in Halifax on 31 March 1800, and moved to Manchester in 1816. Some of his early essays were published in the Retrospective Review.

He perpetrated a literary fraud, the forging of Fragment on Mummies, supposedly by Sir Thomas Browne, that was a highly successful hoax. The bogus nature of the Fragment, given by Crossley to Simon Wilkin to publish, is now regarded as highly probable, but Crossley never precisely confessed to it.

He set up the Chetham Society in 1843, with Thomas Corser, Francis Robert Raines and others: it was named after Humphrey Chetham and its purpose was to edit and publish historical works relating to Lancashire and Cheshire. In the following years he personally edited many of its publications: including the Autobiographical tracts of John Dee (1851), and the Diary of John Worthington. He served as President from 1847 until 1883. He was Vice-President of the Manchester Literary and Philosophical Society during the late 1850s.

He is said to have collected 100,000 books at his residence in Chorlton on Medlock and later Stocks House, Cheetham, Manchester. He supplied the novelist William Ainsworth with historical material and ideas; he was in business with Ainsworth's father Thomas, and their friendship was lifelong.

References

Dictionary of National Biography (ed. L. Stephen); Crossley, James

Further reading
 Crossley, James (1821) Article on the Cheetham Library [sic], Blackwood's Magazine, June, 1821 (reprinted in Ireland, Alexander (1883) The Book-Lover's Enchiridion; 3rd ed. London: Simpkin Marshall; pp. 278–84)
 Aston, J. P. (1823) "The theatre", in Ainsworth, W. H. December Tales; pp. 165–79
 Ellis, S. M., A Great Bibliophile: James Crossley in: Wilkie Collins, Le Fanu and others. London: Constable & Co., 1931 (reissued in 1951 by Constable).
 Collins, Steve, An Eminent Bibliophile and Man of Letters: James Crossley of Manchester, in: "Lancashire & Cheshire Antiquarian Society Transactions"; vol. 97, 2001, pp. 137–152.
 
 Collins, Stephen, James Crossley: A Manchester Man of Letters, Manchester: Chetham Society, 2012.

External links
 
 
 Chetham Society

1800 births
1883 deaths
English writers
People from Halifax, West Yorkshire
English book and manuscript collectors
English male writers
Manchester Literary and Philosophical Society
Record Society of Lancashire and Cheshire
Chetham Society
Lawyers from Manchester